The following is a list of the Teen Choice Award winners and nominees for Choice Action Movie.

Winners and nominees

2000s

2010s

References

Action Movie